Birch Point State Park is a public recreation area occupying  on Penobscot Bay in the town of Owls Head, Knox County, Maine. The state park features a sandy, crescent-shaped "pocket beach" with scenic views of the Muscle Ridge Islands dotting Muscle Ridge Channel. The park is managed by the Maine Department of Agriculture, Conservation and Forestry.

History
Known locally as Lucia Beach, the property was acquired by the state in 1999, in part with funds from the Land for Maine's Future program.

Activities and amenities
The park offers tide pools, gentle surf, swimming in bracing waters, fishing, and picnicking. Short trails lead to the rocks and enclaves of the headlands that frame each end of the beach.

References

External links
Birch Point State Park Department of Agriculture, Conservation and Forestry

State parks of Maine
Protected areas of Knox County, Maine
Beaches of Maine
Landforms of Knox County, Maine
Protected areas established in 1999
1999 establishments in Maine